The Bush–Blair 2003 Iraq memo or Manning memo is a secret memo of a two-hour meeting between American President George W. Bush and British Prime Minister Tony Blair that took place on 31 January 2003 at the White House. The memo purportedly shows at that point, the administrations of Bush and Blair had already decided that the invasion of Iraq would take place two months later. The memo was written by Blair's chief foreign policy adviser, David Manning, who participated in the meeting.

The memo has become controversial for its content, which includes discussing ways to provoke Saddam Hussein into a confrontation, with Bush floating the idea of painting a U-2 spyplane in United Nations (UN) colors and letting it fly low over Iraq to provoke Iraq into shooting it down, thus providing a pretext for the subsequent invasion. 

It also shows Bush and Blair were making a secret deal to carry out the invasion regardless of whether weapons of mass destruction were discovered by UN weapons inspectors, in direct contradiction to statements made by Blair to British Parliament afterwards that Saddam would be given a final chance to disarm.

According to the memo, Bush is paraphrased as saying:

Bush also said to Blair that he "thought it unlikely that there would be internecine warfare between the different religious and ethnic groups" in Iraq after the war. Five pages long, and classified as extremely sensitive, the existence of the memo was first alleged by Philippe Sands in his book Lawless World (2005). It was then obtained by American newspaper The New York Times, which confirmed its authenticity.

UK Liberal Democrat party leader Menzies Campbell said, with regard to the memo: "If these allegations are accurate, the Prime Minister and President Bush were determined to go to war with or without a second UN resolution, and Britain was signed up to do so by the end of January 2003."

See also

Bush-Aznar memo
Casus belli
Downing Street memo
Iraq document leak 18 September 2004
September Dossier
Iraq Dossier
Butler Review
Iraq Inquiry
Yellowcake forgery
Plame affair
Propaganda
Dr. David Kelly
Operation Rockingham
Hussein Kamel al-Majid and his Testimony for UNSCOM 8-22-1995.
Iraqi aluminum tubes
Project for the New American Century
Wolfowitz Doctrine
Bush Doctrine
Scott Ritter

References

External links
The White House meeting that took us to war By Oliver King, Guardian Unlimited, February 2, 2006
Blair-Bush deal before Iraq war revealed in secret memo by Richard Norton-Taylor, The Guardian, February 3, 2006
Bush 'tried to lure Saddam into war using UN aircraft' by Rosemary Bennett and Michael Evans, The Times, February 3, 2006
Fresh claims about the build-up to Iraq war by BBC World Service, February 3, 2006
Bush Was Set on Path to War, Memo by British Adviser Says by Don Van Natta Jr., New York Times, March 27, 2006

2003 in the United Kingdom
2003 in the United States
Causes and prelude of the Iraq War
George W. Bush administration controversies
Memoranda
Political scandals in the United Kingdom
Stances and opinions regarding the Iraq War
Tony Blair
United Kingdom–United States relations